Catching Feelings may refer to:

 Catching Feelings, a 2017 South African romantic drama film
 ""Catching Feelings" (Drax Project song), a 2019 song
 "Catching Feelings", a 2012 song by Justin Bieber from Believe
 "Catching Feelings", a 2005 song by Faith Evans from The First Lady
 "Catching Feelings", a 2017 song by YNW Melly from Collect Call